Laura Longo (born August 22, 1988) is an Italian compound archer. She is the current World Archery number five in women's compound archery. The highest ranking she has reached is the fourth position, which she reached for the last time in April 2012.

Achievements

2007
 World Indoor Championships, women's team, Izmir
23rd, World Indoor Championships, individual, Izmir
 World Cup, women's team, Antalya
2008
 World Indoor Championships, women's team, Rzeszow
17th, World Indoor Championships, individual, Rzeszow
2009
5th, Summer Universiade, individual, Belgrade
7th, Summer Universiade, women's team, Belgrade
 World Outdoor Championships, individual, Ulsan
9th, World Outdoor Championships, women's team, Ulsan
2010
 European Outdoor Championships, women's team, Rovereto
8th, European Outdoor Championships, individual, Rovereto
 European Grand Prix, individual, Yerevan
 European Grand Prix, mixed team, Moscow
4th, World University Championships, women's team, Shenzhen
4th, World University Championships, mixed team, Shenzhen
6th, World University Championships, individual, Shenzhen
2011
 EMAU Grand Prix, individual, Antalya
 World Cup, individual, Poreč
 EMAU Grand Prix, women's team, Boé
 World Cup, mixed team, Antalya
5th, World Outdoor Championships, women's team, Turin
57th, World Outdoor Championships, individual, Turin
 World Cup, individual, Ogden
 World Cup, individual, Shanghai
5th, World Cup Final, individual, Istanbul
2012
4th, World Indoor Championships, women's team, Las Vegas
8th, World Indoor Championships, individual, Las Vegas
 World Cup, women's team, Shanghai
 World Cup, women's team, Antalya
 European Outdoor Championships, women's team, Amsterdam
17th, European Outdoor Championships, individual, Amsterdam

References

External links
 

Italian female archers
Living people
1988 births
21st-century Italian women